The Francis and Harriet Baker House is a historic house in Atchison, Kansas. It was built in 1902 for Francis Baker, the co-founder of a grain elevator business in Kansas and Nebraska, and his wife Harriet, the daughter of Atchison's mayor. It was purchased by Frank Harwi, the president of the A.J. Harwi Hardware Company, in 1918.

The house was designed by Root & Siemens in the Mission Revival architectural style and was termed "modern" by Root. It has been listed on the National Register of Historic Places since August 28, 2003.

References

Houses on the National Register of Historic Places in Kansas
National Register of Historic Places in Atchison County, Kansas
Mission Revival architecture in Kansas
Houses completed in 1902